Süller can refer to:

 Süller, Çal
 Süller, Sındırgı